Zhang Lin (born 1965) is a lieutenant general in the People's Liberation Army of China who is the current head of the Logistic Support Department of the Central Military Commission, in office since January 2022.

Biography
Zhang was born in 1965. He became director of the Agency for Offices Administration of the Central Military Commission in March 2021, and soon was commissioned as head of the Logistic Support Department of the Central Military Commission in January 2022.

He attained the rank of lieutenant general (zhongjiang) in January 2022.

References

1965 births
Living people
People's Liberation Army generals
Chinese politicians
Chinese Communist Party politicians